The rufous-winged sparrow (Peucaea carpalis) is a medium-small, long-tailed New World sparrow with a gray face and rusty crown and supercilium; the rufous lesser coverts of the wing for which it is named are often concealed.

Description
The back is brown with darker streaks, while the belly is pale gray. The wings and crown are rust-colored. This sparrow has a conical, yellow-based bill and a long brown tail.

Distribution and habitat
Peucaea carpalis is a year-round resident from south-central Arizona and Guadalupe Canyon, New Mexico, south to northern Sinaloa, Mexico.

The rufous-winged sparrow inhabits desert grasslands with scattered mesquite or cholla. It also occurs in washes with sandy bottoms and vegetated slopes, brushy irrigation ditches, and creeks bordered by broad-leaved trees, mesquite, grasses, and forbs.

Diet
During the breeding season, adult rufous-winged sparrows feed on a variety of insects, caught on the wing or gleaned off plant surfaces. At other times, the bird eats seeds.

Breeding
Rufous-winged sparrows usually breed during the monsoon months of July and August. The nest is built low in small trees, bushes, or cactus, including hackberry, palo verde, cholla, and mesquite. The average clutch size is four; pairs may have two broods per year.

Status
This species is listed as a migratory bird under the Migratory Bird Treaty Act.

History in Pima County, Arizona
The rufous-winged sparrow in Pima County: This species was discovered by Charles Emil Bendire in 1872, near old Fort Lowell, Tucson, where it was common. In 1881, the sparrow was found "sparingly about Tucson and Camp Lowell. It inhabited the mesquite thickets, keeping closely hidden in the bunches of  'sacaton' grass, from which, when flushed, it flew into the branches above."

By the late 1880s, the species was probably extirpated from Arizona, perhaps as a result of overgrazing. The species began to recover in the United States around 1936, and is now found in appropriate habitat throughout much of eastern Pima County, Santa Cruz County, and western Cochise County. Loss of habitat as a result of overgrazing and urban development is believed to have had the greatest effect on populations.

References

Peucaea
Native birds of the Western United States
Birds of Mexico
Birds described in 1873